Mark Allen McGrath (born December 17, 1957) is a former American football wide receiver in the National Football League for the Seattle Seahawks and the Washington Redskins. He played college football at Montana State University.

References

1957 births
Living people
American football wide receivers
Montana State Bobcats football players
Seattle Seahawks players
Washington Redskins players
Players of American football from San Diego